Bosetti is a surname. Notable people with the surname include:

Alexy Bosetti (born 1993), French footballer
Caterina Bosetti, Italian volleyball player
Giulio Bosetti (1930–2009), Italian actor and actor
Hermine Bosetti (1875–1936), German coloratura soprano
Rick Bosetti (born 1953), American baseball player